Luitel or Luintel is a surname found in Nepal and India. Luitel is a toponymic family name from Luyati gaun (Luyati village). Luitels are of hill Nepali heritage which is evident from their physical appearance. 

Notable people with the surname include:

Jaya Luintel, Nepali journalist
Jiwan Luitel, Nepalese actor                        
Sanchita Luitel, Nepalese actress
Achyut Luitel, Nepalese aid worker
Agyat Luitel, Nepali writer

References

Ethnic groups in Nepal
Bahun
Nepali-language surnames
Surnames of Nepalese origin
Khas surnames